Kilgallon is the name of several people:

Matthew Kilgallon (born 1984), English footballer
T. J. Kilgallon (born 1961), Irish Gaelic footballer

See also
Kilgallen, a surname